Canim Lake  is an unincorporated settlement with a pop. of 228 and First Nations Indian reserve community in British Columbia, Canada. It is located east of 100 Mile House in the Cariboo Region.

The settlement is home to the Canim Lake Band (Tsq'escen') of the Northern Shuswap Tribal Council, and lies at the southwestern end of Canim Lake.

"Canim" means a type of large canoe in the Chinook Jargon.

See also
Canim Beach Provincial Park
Canim Falls
Canim River

Unincorporated settlements in British Columbia
Indian reserves in British Columbia
Geography of the Cariboo
Populated places in the Cariboo Regional District
Secwepemc
Chinook Jargon place names